Beauty and the Beast: Belle's Magical World is a 1998 direct-to-video animated musical film produced by Walt Disney Television Animation. It was released on February 17, 1998, and is a sequel to the 1991 Walt Disney Pictures animated feature film Beauty and the Beast and the third and final installment in the Beauty and the Beast trilogy, featuring the voices of David Ogden Stiers as Cogsworth, Robby Benson as The Beast, Gregory Grudt, who replaced Bradley Pierce as Chip Potts, Paige O'Hara as Belle, Anne Rogers, who replaced Angela Lansbury as Mrs. Potts, and Jerry Orbach as Lumiere. The film features two songs performed by Belle, "Listen With Our Hearts" and "A Little Thought." This storyline is set within the timeline of the original Beauty and the Beast (after Christmas but before the fight against Gaston).

When first released in 1998, the film consisted of three connected segments, which are "The Perfect Word", "Fifi's Folly" and "The Broken Wing". For the special edition released in 2003, another segment was included, "Mrs. Potts' Party" (from Belle's Tales of Friendship) making the film 22 minutes longer.

Production
The film consists of three episodes of an unreleased television show, loosely woven together in a feature-length story and also based on the original Disney animated feature. It was produced by Walt Disney Television Animation and animated by Toon City Animation, Inc. in Manila, Philippines and Thai Wang Film Productions in Bangkok, Thailand. Finished and copyrighted in 1997, at the time when Beauty and the Beast: The Enchanted Christmas was also completed, the film was released January 13, 1998.

Plot

The Perfect Word
Beast (Robby Benson) and Belle (Paige O'Hara) plan to eat together, and Beast asks for advice from Lumiere (Jerry Orbach). While Cogsworth (David Ogden Stiers) escorts Belle to the dining room, they come across the castle's well-meaning but rather verbose scribe, Webster (Jim Cummings), turned into a dictionary, whom Belle invites to join them in the dining room (to Cogsworth's dismay).

During the meal, while Belle explains a story she has been reading to Beast, Beast gets sweaty. He demands for the windows to be opened, despite there being a draft of air in the room and the servants getting cold. Beast and Belle get into an argument, and Beast strikes Webster off the table when the dictionary begins giving unwanted synonyms to Belle's insults. Subsequently, they both stop speaking to each other, despite Lumiere and Cogsworth's attempts to patch things up. Eventually, Webster, feeling guilty for his part, forges a letter of apology from Beast to Belle with his friends, a pile of papers named Crane (Jeff Bennett) and a quill named LePlume (Rob Paulsen). Belle sees the letter, and makes amends with Beast.

That night, however, the truth comes out, and after a furious chase around the castle, Beast catches and banishes Webster with brokenhearted dinner, Crane and LePlume for the forgery, throwing them into the forest. Belle ventures out and brings them back, and Beast, touched by Belle's sympathy, forgives the three and allows them back in, realizing that their intentions were good. The moral of the story is that it is easy to forgive, and the song "Listen With Our Hearts" plays.

Fifi's Folly
On Valentine's Day, Lumiere grows nervous to the point that he cleans himself excessively and turns to Belle for advice, by walking with her in the garden and reciting what he plans to say to Fifi (Kimmy Robertson) to her. Fifi overhears this, and believes that Lumiere and Belle are having an affair behind her back. In reality, Lumiere has planned a surprise snow ride around the castle gardens with Fifi. To get back at Lumiere, Fifi attempts to make Cogsworth like her, who is apparently not interested.

In the end, things are cleared up and Lumiere and Fifi go for the ride, but the pot they are sitting in slips off the edge of the balcony and hangs over the moat. Lumiere holds onto Fifi while hanging for dear life, and tells her that he loves her. Before they can fall, Belle, Cogsworth and a few more servants arrive and get them back to safety. Everyone ends up learning to not jump to conclusions, and Lumiere and Fifi kiss.

Mrs. Potts' Party
Mrs. Potts is feeling depressed due to dreadful weather, and Belle decides to cheer her up by throwing a surprise party for her. Belle has come to look at Mrs. Potts as a mother figure by this point. During preparations for the party, Belle and her friends have to avoid waking up the sleeping Beast. Beast spent the entire previous night fixing a leak in the roof and needs his sleep. However, Lumiere and Cogsworth's rivalry gets in the way. The two argue and compete over the tasks of composing music, choosing Mrs. Potts' favorite flowers, and choosing the flavors of the cake that will be served at the party. Two oven mits, Chaude (the red mit) and Tres (the blue mit), also take part in the argument, as they each side with one of the rivals.

Eventually, Lumiere and Cogsworth's attempt to sabotage one another's decisions has consequences. The baking cake explodes and makes a complete mess in the kitchen. Lumiere and Cogsworth, after a scolding from Belle, decide to put their rivalry behind them for good and work together to make a small surprise for Mrs. Potts. The plan goes well, Mrs. Potts is cured of her depression, and the sun finally shines again. Everyone learns the power of cooperation and compromises, accompanied by the song "A Little Thought".

The Broken Wing
Belle and Beast arrange to have lunch together again, but an injured bird accidentally flies into Belle's room, and she forgets her arrangement, instead paying more attention to the bird. Beast discovers this, and flies into a rage, as he has a strong dislike for birds, trying to catch the bird, but he trips over Cogsworth and hits his head hard on the floor. This strips him of his hatred for birds, but his selfishness remains, driving him to lock the bird in a cage and demand that he sing for him when he pleases, but the obviously saddened and frightened bird refuses.

Meanwhile, Cogsworth feels he is losing control over his staff, and demands their respect with harsh treatment. In the meantime, Belle convinces Beast to release the bird once its wing is cured. But the bird, still too weak, begins to fall, and Beast rushes to rescue it. In the process, Cogsworth falls from the West Wing balcony and into the garden. He is unhurt, and learns that you cannot demand respect, but you can earn it by giving it. Belle and Beast make amends, and Beast learns to treat people and animals with respect, compassion and attention.

Voice cast

David Ogden Stiers - Cogsworth, Narrator
Robby Benson - Beast
Gregory Grudt - Chip
Paige O'Hara - Belle
Anne Rogers - Mrs. Potts
Jerry Orbach - Lumiere
Kimmy Robertson - Fifi the Featherduster
Frank Welker - Sultan the Footstool
Jim Cummings - Webster, Tubaloo, Chef Bouche, Punch Bowl
Jeff Bennett - Crane, Frappe
Rob Paulsen - LePlume, Tres, Egg Beater
April Winchell - Chandeleria, Chaude, Concertina
Jo Anne Worley - Armoire the Wardrobe

Home media 
Belle's Magical World was released on VHS in the United States and Canada on February 17, 1998; the film consisted of three connected segments called The Perfect World, Fifi's Folly and The Broken Wing. In the first two days of its release, sales of its VHS copies were more than expected. Ultimately, more than a million copies were sold. At the time, the film ranked among the top 10 top-selling videos of all time, bringing in profits.

The film was retitled to Beauty and the Beast: Belle's Magical World for its Special Edition, when released on VHS and DVD on February 25, 2003 in North America. This release included another segment from the cancelled TV series, called Mrs. Potts Party, making the film 22 minutes longer. Although this segment was not featured in the original version of the film, its footage of Belle's song "A Little Thought" was featured on a Disney Sing Along Songs home video release in North America and Southeast Asia, Honor to Us All, which featured songs from Mulan (1998), Hercules (1997), Pocahontas II: Journey to a New World, The Lion King II: Simba's Pride, and Disney's other animated productions.

The film was re-released on DVD on November 22, 2011 with a new bonus feature, Sing Me a Story with Belle episode, "What's Inside Counts".

In 2019, the original version of the film was released on Disney+. It marked the first release of the film without the additional segment Mrs. Potts Party since the original release on VHS. Despite that, the second song "A Little Thought" has been accidentally removed from this printing. Currently, it is the only Beauty and the Beast film available in standard-definition.

Critical reception
On Rotten Tomatoes, the film has an approval rating of 17% with an average rating of 3.1/10, based on 6 reviews.

DVDDizzy spoke poorly of the "Disney employee who had the idea to salvage episodes created for an animated TV series that wasn't going to materialize by stringing them together as a direct-to-video feature film", noting that it resulted in one of the very worst movies Disney put their name on.

Awards and nominations

|-
|rowspan=2|1998
| Belle's Magical World
| Annie Award for Outstanding Achievement in an Animated Home Video Production
| 
|-
| Paige O'Hara for playing "Belle"
| Annie Award for Outstanding Individual Achievement for Voice Acting by a Female Performer in an Animated Feature Production
| 
|-
| 1999
| Belle's Magical World
| Golden Reel Award for Best Sound Editing - Direct to Video - Sound
| 
|}

References

External links
 
 
  
 
 Movie/DVD Review at UltimateDisney.com

1998 films
1998 animated films
1998 direct-to-video films
1990s American animated films
1998 fantasy films
1990s musical films
1990s romance films
American anthology films
American children's films
American sequel films
Animated films about birds
Direct-to-video sequel films
Disney direct-to-video animated films
DisneyToon Studios animated films
Beauty and the Beast (franchise)
Films scored by Harvey Cohen
Films about animals
Films about books
Films about infidelity
Films about princes
Films set in castles
Animated films set in France
Films about magic
Disney Television Animation films
1990s children's animated films
1990s English-language films